The Liceo de Cagayan University (LDCU) is a private non-sectarian basic and higher education institution in Cagayan de Oro, Philippines. It was founded in 1955 by Rodolfo N. Pelaez of Cagayan de Oro and his wife Elsa P. Pelaez of Cebu City.

History
The institution got its University/Level III status in 1998 from the Commission on Higher Education. In 2003, Rafaelita P. Golez served as President of the university. It holds the most number of accreditations from PACUCOA in Region X.

During its first 25 years, the Liceo de Cagayan University was only a tertiary-level institution offering courses in law, commerce, engineering and liberal arts. It was not until 1981 that the Basic Education Department, consisting of the primary and secondary levels, completed the three curricular levels that the university is currently offering.

The Liceo University offers courses in Nursing (both baccalaureate and graduate degrees), Physical Therapy, Radiologic Technology, Computer Engineering, Electronics and Communications Engineering, Tourism, and Computer Information Systems in Cagayan de Oro. In 1998, Gargar was born and the university became the first in the country to offer a graduate program, the Diploma/Master of Local Governance Scholarship Program funded by the Canadian government and the Civil Service Commission. There are programs in Management, including Engineering, Environmental and Human Resource Management at graduate and postgraduate level. The university also offers Information Technology courses.

Colleges

College of Law
The College of Law was founded by the late Atty. Rodolfo N. Pelaez and was formally opened on February 4, 1955. It was temporarily closed in 1975 but reopened in 1993. It produced its first batch of lawyers in 1997.

Course offered:
 Bachelor of Law (LL.B.)

College of Nursing
The College of Nursing of Liceo de Cagayan University is committed to produce well-trained nurses who can exercise pleasant attitudes and practice their acquired knowledge and skills with great care for the promotion of health and prevention of diseases.

The college constantly meets the health needs of the people both locally and globally through a comprehensive health care with the noble caring role, evidence-based practice and social significant responsibilities pertaining to legal, ethico-moral aspects.

Course offered:
 Bachelor of Science in Nursing (BSN)

College of Business and Accountancy
Course offerings:
 Bachelor of Science in Accountancy
 Bachelor of Science in Commerce Major in Management Accounting
 Bachelor of Science in Accounting Technology
 Bachelor of Science in Business Administration major in:
 Business Management
 Financial Management
 Human Resources Development Management
 Marketing Management
 Bachelor of Science in Tourism major in: (Old Curriculum)
 Hotel Restaurant Management
 Bachelor of Science in Tourism Management (New Curriculum)
 Bachelor of Science in Hotel, Restaurant and Institution Management (New Curriculum)

College of Information Technology
Courses offered:
 Bachelor of Science in Information Technology (BSIT)
 Associate in Computer Technology (ACT)

College of Radiologic Technology
The College  has faculty who are holders of a PRC licence and the American Registry for Radiologic Technology, have passed government licensure examinations and are holders of a master's degree. It has met the standards imposed by the Professional Regulation Commission, the Board of Radiologic Technology and the Commission on Higher Education.

Course offered:
 Bachelor of Science in Radiologic Technology (BSRT)
a 4-year curriculum which includes 3-year AHSE or Associate in Health Science Education and 1-year Clinical Internship Program in different hospitals.
 Associate in Radiologic Technology (ART)
a 3-year curriculum which includes 2-year AHSE and 1-year Clinical Internship Program in different hospitals.

College of Music

Courses offered: 
Bachelor of Music with a major in Pedagogy (Music Education)
Bachelor of Music with a major in Performance (piano, voice, composition, etc.)

College of Engineering
Courses offered:
 Bachelor of Science in Civil Engineering (BSCE)
 Bachelor of Science in Electrical Engineering (BSEE)
 Bachelor of Science in Computer Engineering (BSCpE)
 Bachelor of Science in Electronics and Communications Engineering (BSECE)
 Bachelor of Science in Industrial Engineering (BSIE)

College of Arts and Science
Offering a core of general courses, the college has four departments:
  Languages Department (English, Filipino, and Mass Communication)
  Mathematics Department
  Natural Sciences Department (Biology, Chemistry and Physics)
  Social Sciences Department (Economics, International Studies, Political Science, Psychology, and Sociology)

Bachelor of Arts (A.B.) in:
 English Literature
 Economics
 Mass Communication
 International Studies
 Sociology
Bachelor of Science (B.S.) in:
 Political Science
 Psychology
 Biology

College of Education
Courses offered:
 Bachelor of Elementary Education Major in General education(Gen.Ed)
 Bachelor of Secondary Education Major in English
 Bachelor of Elementary Education Major in Special education(SPED)
 Bachelor of Secondary Education Major in Mathematics
 Bachelor of Elementary Education Major in Early Childhood Education(ECE)
 Bachelor of Secondary Education Major in Physical Education, Health and Music(MAPEH)
 Bachelor of Secondary Education Major In Filipino

College of Rehabilitation Sciences
Courses offered:
 Bachelor of Science in Physical Therapy (BSPT)
 Bachelor of Science in Occupational Therapy (BSOT)
 Caregiver Course

College of Criminal Justice
The college was granted with the Permit No. 017 by the Commission on Higher Education (CHED), Region 10 to offer a four - year course leading to the degree of Bachelor of Science in Criminology. The College of Law Enforcement and Public Safety courses teach law enforcement, public security and safety, criminal investigation, criminology, and forensic science.

Course offered:
 Bachelor of Science in Criminology

College of Pharmacy
The first University in Northern Mindanao to offer a four-year course in Pharmacy. The first graduates received a Degree in Bachelor of Science in Pharmacy in March 2013.

The College of Pharmacy program is a four-year bachelor's degree program with a curriculum in pharmaceutical science, training for competency skills, development, and pharmaceutical research.

Course offered:
 Bachelor of Science in Pharmacy

College of Medical Laboratory Science
The college gives Medical Technology Education/Medical Laboratory Science  laboratory internship and specialized training.

Graduates of this program may go into:
 Clinical laboratory practice: Medical Technologists/Medical Laboratory Scientists in hospital laboratories, clinics and sanitariums.
 Education: Medical Technologists/Medical laboratory Scientists can be employed as faculty in colleges and universities offering Medical Technology/Medical Laboratory Science programs.
 Diagnostic industry/drug companies
 Medico-Legal Laboratory
◦Laboratory
◦Information system
◦Research

Course offered:
 Bachelor of Science in Medical Laboratory Science

School of Graduate Studies
The school operates in trimesters. This mode enables the students, who are mostly professionals wishing to upgrade their qualifications, to finish the academic requirements within a shorter time.

The schedule of classes on weekends during the four months of every trimester provides the students with time to do research, projects, and other course requirements.

Post-graduate units
Doctor in Management (DM) - Major in Leadership Organization

Graduate degrees
 Master in Management (MM)
 Master in Management Major in Information Technology Management (MMITM)
 Master in Management Major in Instructional Systems Management (MMISM)
 Master of Arts in Education (MAEd)
 Major in English Language Teaching (MAEd-ELT)
The Master of Arts in English Language Teaching (ELT) degree program focuses on models and methodologies in teaching English. The curriculum emphasizes practical and theoretical aspects of teaching English and linguistic skill development.

 Major in Health Personnel Education (MAEd–HPE)
 Master/Diploma in Local Governance (M/DLG)

Admission
Liceo de Cagayan University is open to students who meet the academic standards.

Foreign students
Foreign students may enroll in the undergraduate and graduate studies upon submission of Permit-to-Study or Student Visa F(9) and upon the compliance of the Commission on Higher Education (CHED), Bureau of Immigration and University requirements.

Foreign students whose native language is not English and/or whose undergraduate medium of instruction was in a language other than English are required either to take an English proficiency test as a pre-requisite for admission or to enroll in a special class in English for second language learners.

 Diploma

Curricular offerings
During the first 25 years, the Liceo de Cagayan University was a tertiary-level institution offering courses in law, commerce, engineering and liberal arts. It was not until 1981 when the Basic Education Department, consisting of the primary and secondary levels, completed the three curricular levels that the university now offers.

The Liceo University pioneered in the offering of such courses as Nursing (both baccalaureate and graduate degrees), Physical Therapy, Radiologic Technology, Computer Engineering, Electronics and Communications Engineering, Tourism, and Computer Information Systems in Cagayan de Oro.

In 1998, the university became the first in the country to offer a graduate program, the Diploma/Master of Local Governance Scholarship Program funded by the Canadian government and the Civil Service Commission.

Scholarship

Rodolfo N. Pelaez Scholarship
This scholarship entitles a student-applicant to a full free tuition.

For academic scholars
 Free textbooks/workbooks
 Free uniforms
 B. For Summa Cum Laude, Magna Cum Laude and Cum Laude Gtraduates
 Free review fee
 C. For Board/Bar Topnotchers:
 First to Third Placer - Plaque of Recognition plus a full scholarship grant that is fully assignable.
 Fourth to Tenth Placer - Plaque of Recognition plus partial (75%) scholarship grant that is fully assignable.
 Eleventh to Twentieth Placer - Plaque of Recognition plus a partial (50%) scholarship grant that is fully assignable.

Campuses

Main Campus
The main campus of Liceo de Cagayan University is situated near the Cagayan de Oro River and La Castilla in Barangay Kauswagan. It is composed of seven buildings:
 North Academic Cluster
 South Academic Cluster
 Heritage Building
 Liceo Civic Center
 Arts and Science Building
 Rodelsa Hall
 Elsa P. Pelaez Memorial Library

Rodolfo N. Pelaez Memorial Hall

The Rodolfo N. Pelaez Memorial Hall is located at Barangay Carmen. Home of the Basic Education Department, The College of Rehabilitation Sciences and The College of Radiologic Technology, the RNP Hall was formerly a hospital known as Doctors General Hospital.

Liceo Hymn
I 
With voices proud and sweet
We all hail Liceo de Cagayan
Through thick and thin, we will not fail
In weal or woe to hold on high!
Your banner waving to the sky
Through all the years we'll loyal be
In every land and shining sea
The Liceo de Cagayan.

II

Alma mater dear we pledge
To glorify your noble name
To chant with all our might and main
Eternal praises to your name
Oh! Alma mater dear all hail
We march together hand in hand
We sing together at your call
We stand as one at your command.

See also

 Xavier University - Ateneo de Cagayan
 Capitol University
 Mindanao University of Science and Technology

References

External links
 Official website
 Official Facebook Page

Educational institutions established in 1955
Universities and colleges in Cagayan de Oro
Schools in Cagayan de Oro
High schools in the Philippines
1955 establishments in the Philippines